The 25th New Zealand Parliament was a term of the New Zealand Parliament. It opened on 25 March 1936, following the 1935 election. It was dissolved on 16 September 1938 in preparation for the 1938 election.

The 25th Parliament was notable in that it was the first time the Labour Party had a parliamentary majority and formed a government, the First Labour Government. The new Prime Minister was Michael Joseph Savage. The opposition consisted of the United Party and the Reform Party, which merged to form the National Party in 1936.

The 25th Parliament consisted of eighty representatives, each elected from separate geographical electorates. As the 1935 elections had been a landslide victory for the Labour Party, the 25th Parliament was dominated by Labour MPs — 53 of the 80 were members of the Labour Party. The main opposition consisted of a coalition of the Reform Party, the United Party, and three independents, having a total of 19 MPs. Part way through the 25th Parliament, Reform and United took their coalition to the next step, and merged into a single group. This was called the National Party. The smaller Country Party and Rātana movement had two MPs each, and there were four independents not aligned with the coalition. The Democrat Party, despite winning a significant portion of the vote, did not hold any seats.

Electoral boundaries

Ministries
The 24th Parliament had been led by a coalition of the Reform Party and the United Party, formed in September 1931 during the term of the 23rd Parliament and led by George Forbes.  The primary opposition had been the Labour Party.

At the 1935 election, the Labour Party obtained a parliamentary majority and formed a government, the First Labour Government. The leader of the Labour Party, Michael Joseph Savage, became Prime Minister.  The opposition consisted of the United Party and the Reform Party, which merged in 1936 during the term of the 25th Parliament to form the National Party. The Savage Ministry was in power until Savage's death on 27 March 1940.

Party standings

1935-36

1936-38

Members

Initial MPs

By-elections during 25th Parliament
There was one by-election during the term of the 25th Parliament.

Summary of changes
Bill Jordan, the Labour MP for Manukau, resigned in 1936 to become the New Zealand High Commissioner to the United Kingdom. He was replaced by Arthur Osborne, also of the Labour Party.
In 1936, the Reform Party and the United Party merged, becoming the National Party. The three independents who supported the Reform-United coalition (James Hargest, William Polson and James Roy) also joined the new group.

Notes

References

New Zealand parliaments